Coleophora tunisiae is a moth of the family Coleophoridae. It is found in Tunisia and Algeria.

The length of the forewings is about 6 mm for males and about 5.5 mm for females. Adults have been recorded in May.

References

tunisiae
Moths of Africa
Moths described in 2007